The Walter NZ 120 was a nine-cylinder, air-cooled, radial engine for aircraft use built in Czechoslovakia by Walter Aircraft Engines in the 1920s. Using common cylinders and parts from the NZ (Novák-Zeithammer) range of engines the NZ 120 produced up to 135 horsepower (99 kW).

Applications
Avia B.122
Breda Ba.26
Fizir FN
Junkers K 16
Letov Š-218
Praga BH-39NZ
RWD 8

Specifications

See also

References

Notes

Bibliography

 Gunston, Bill. World Encyclopaedia of Aero Engines. Cambridge, England. Patrick Stephens Limited, 1989. 

1920s aircraft piston engines
Aircraft air-cooled radial piston engines
NZ 120